Ubeshwar Mahadev Temple (Hindi: उबेश्वर महादेव) is a popular temple of the Lord Shiva in the Udaipur city in the state of Rajasthan, India. This temple is located on a green hill in the Ubeshwar, area of Udaipur. It is a popular temple of the Lord Shiva. Within the premises there is a holy pond (Gangu Kund) for ritual bathing.

References

Hindu temples in Rajasthan
Shiva temples in Rajasthan
Tourist attractions in Udaipur district